was a Japanese actress. Her skill was Buyō.  She died of stroke

Personal life
Maya was born in Busan, Korea during the Japanese colonial era, and grew up in Hita, Ōita, Japan. She married actor Sumio Takatsu (高津住男) in 1969; he died of liver cancer in 2010.

Maya died on 28 December 2017.

Filmography

Films

Dramas

Variety series

Advertisements

References

External links
Goo News profile 

Japanese actresses
1942 births
2017 deaths
People from Busan
People from Ōita Prefecture
Japanese people with disabilities